The Honda MVX250F is a Honda motorcycle with a water-cooled two-stroke V3 engine. New Zealand was one of the few countries in the world outside Japan where the MVX 250 was sold brand new through Honda motorcycle dealerships. The engine is mounted in the frame with the two outer cylinders facing horizontally forward and the rear cylinder vertical.

See also
List of motorcycles by type of engine

References

MVX250F
Sport bikes
Two-stroke motorcycles
Motorcycles introduced in 1983
V3 engines